In the 2010–11 season, UD Almería played in two competitions: La Liga and the Copa del Rey. It was their fourth season in the top flight since promotion from the 2006–07 Segunda División.

Squad
Retrieved on 29 November 2020

Out on loan

Almería B players

Retrieved on 29 November 2020

Transfers

In

Out

Player statistics

Squad stats 
Last updated on 30 November 2020.

|-
|colspan="14"|Players who have left the club after the start of the season:

|}

Top Scorers
Updated on 30 November 2020

Disciplinary Record
Updated on 30 November 2020

Season Results

Preseason

La Liga

Results summary

Matches

Copa del Rey

Round of 32

Almería won 5–3 on aggregate

Round of 16

Almería won 8–6 on aggregate

Quarterfinals

Almería won 4–2 on aggregate

Semifinals

Barcelona won 8–0 on aggregate

References

Almeria
UD Almería seasons